Yana Urqu (Quechua yana black, urqu mountain, "black mountain", other spellings Yana Orco, Yana Orkho) is a mountain in the Anta Q'awa mountain range of the Bolivian Andes, about 4,860 m (15,945 ft) high. It is situated south-east of Potosí in the Potosí Department, in the north of the José María Linares Province. Yana Urqu lies south-east and east of the mountains Q'umir Qucha and Khunurana.

See also 
 Jatun Kunturiri

References 

Mountains of Potosí Department